is a 1987 Japanese pink film directed by Hisayasu Satō. It was produced by producer-director Kan Mukai's Shishi Productions. It was released by Nikkatsu and shown as the third feature of a triple-bill with two films in their Roman Porno series. The film includes the first screen role for Takeshi Itō, who would go on to be one of the most popular pink film actors of his era. Takeshi Itō won the first Best Actor award at the Pink Grand Prix for his performance in Toshiya Ueno's Keep on Masturbating: Non-Stop Pleasure, and lead actress of Lolita: Vibrator Torture, Kiyomi Itō was awarded Best Actress at the same ceremony for Hisayasu Satō's Dirty Wife Getting Wet.

Synopsis
A man captures schoolgirls and takes them to an abandoned freight container in Shinjuku which he has decorated with enlarged black & white images of the faces of his previous victims. He smears the captive girls with paint and shaving cream, rapes, tortures and brutally murders them.

Cast
 Sayaka Kimura
 Kiyomi Itō
 Rio Yanagawa
 Yūko Suwano
 Ayako Toyama
 Yutaka Ikejima

Critical reception
Allmovie, noting the film's "strong graphic visuals" judges Lolita: Vibrator Torture to be "[o]ne of Sato's most repellent and excessive pinku-eiga films." In reference to genre, the review concludes that "[t]he focus here is on sadism and gore rather than erotica." In their Japanese Cinema Encyclopedia: The Sex Films the Weissers confirm that this "is usually cited as Sato's most grotesque film."

Jasper Sharp writes that Lolita: Vibrator Torture "does for the marital aid what Tobe Hooper did for the chainsaw." He uses the film as an example of Satō's use of the distorting ability of the camera, pointing out the "stroboscopic intensity" that the flashing stills camera adds to the disturbing imagery of the film.

He remembers, "One day I saw Lolita Vibrator Torture by Hisayasu Satō, and was fascinated by this film, which was completely different from anything I had ever seen before." Satō's presence at Shishi Productions, where he directed Lolita: Vibrator Torture was influential in Tajiri's decision to join the studio in 1990.

Availability
Lolita: Vibrator Torture was released theatrically on September 19, 1987. This was Satō's original title for the film.

Bibliography

English

French

Japanese

Notes

1987 films
1980s pornographic films
Films directed by Hisayasu Satō
1980s Japanese-language films
Pink films
Nikkatsu films
Films set in Tokyo
1980s Japanese films